This is a list of episodes for the Teletoon animated series, Rocket Monkeys. The series first premiered on January 10, 2013 on Teletoon in Canada. It has been acquired by Nickelodeon in the United States and its global networks and premiered on the channel on March 4, 2013.

On June 11, 2013, the series was renewed for a second season. 

On October 15, 2014, the series was renewed for a third season.

Series overview
In the original production order, the series only has two seasons, with the second one consisting of 39 half-hour episodes (78 segments), as seen in the end credits. This list follows the Teletoon broadcasting order, which labels the first 13 episodes as the second season and the last 26 as the third one.
{| class="wikitable"
|-
! style="padding:0 8px;" colspan="2" rowspan="2"| Season
! style="padding:0 8px;" rowspan="2"| Episodes
! style="padding:0 80px;" colspan="2"| Original airdate
|-
! First aired
! Last aired
|-
| style="background:#6A4794;"| 
| style="text-align:center;"| 1
| style="text-align:center;"| 26 (52 segments)
| style="text-align:center;"| 
| style="text-align:center;"| 
|-
| bgcolor="#FF5F5F" |
| align="center" | 2
| align="center" | 13 (26 segments)
| align="center" | 
| align="center" | 
|-
| bgcolor="#175D88" |
| align="center" | 3
| align="center" | 26 (52 segments)
| align="center" | 
| align="center" | 
|-
| style="background:#000000;"|
| colspan="2" style="text-align:center;" | Special
| style="text-align:center;" colspan="3"| October 25, 2015
|}

Episode list

Season 1 (2013–14)

Season 2 (2014–15)

Season 3 (2016)

"Terrors and Tiaras"
"Terrors and Tiaras" is an hour-long stand-alone special (under Season 2) that aired on October 25, 2015.

Notes

References

Rocket Monkeys